Sewing a Friendship is a children's graphic novel written by Natalie Tinti. It tells the story of five young girls who must learn to work together and become friends in order to participate in a fashion show.

Story
As the story begins a group of four girls: Nina Key, Jonesy Jipsy, Meeka Venya, and Skoron Blossom, start their summer vacation, planning a special all-pink sleepover. They decide to participate in a famous fashion show. But there is a hitch, they need 5 members on their team to participate, and the model can be no younger than 9. At the advice of Skoron's mysterious grandmother Babushka, the four girls befriend a loner named Kiki Shaver. Being 9 years old, Kiki would make a perfect team member. The only problem, she isn't interested. With a little bit of help from Babushka, and Skoron's dog Dogon, the girls are able to convince Kiki to join the team, and in the process the 5 girls become good friends.

Reception
As the debut book for the then 9 year old Natalie Tinti, Sewing a Friendship attracted a fair bit of attention and press from the media both for her age and the message. Further Sewing Friendship went on to win awards including: (the) Seal of Approval 2011, Children's Literary Classics, Silver Award 2010 as Outstanding Young Contributor hosted by Mom’s Choice Awards, Bronze Award 2010 Children’s Picture Book All Ages hosted by Young Voices Foundation, Finalist 2010 in the Children’s Picture Book Softcover Category hosted by International Book Awards, Winner 2010 in Children’s Motivation Category hosted by National Indie Excellence Awards, Winner Spring 2010 Pinnacle Achievement Award hosted by the North American Book-dealers Exchange, Silver Medal 2009 in Children Chapter Books hosted by Readers Favorite Book Reviews.

Reader reviews have been equally positive with the book garnering 4.5/5 stars on Amazon, and 4.6/5 on Goodreads.

References

External links
 Natalie Tinti Author Website

2009 graphic novels
2009 children's books
American picture books
American children's novels
American graphic novels
Children's books about friendship
Novels about friendship